Alberto Tarradas Paneque (born 1996) is a Spanish politician and a member of the Parliament of Catalonia for the Vox party.

Paneque was born to a Catalan family in Girona. He speaks Catalan, Spanish, English and Italian.

He is the president of Vox in Girona and headed the list for the party in the Girona constituency during the 2021 Catalan regional election in which he was elected. He is currently the youngest representative in the Catalan Parliament.

References

1996 births
Living people
Politicians from Catalonia
Vox (political party) politicians